OutFront Minnesota is an LGBT rights organization in the state of Minnesota in the United States, founded in 1987. The organization is community-based and uses memberships and other fundraising to support its activities, as well as receiving support from foundations and corporations.

OutFront Minnesota is a member of United ENDA, a national campaign to ensure transgender persons are included in national employment nondiscrimination legislation. The organization works in coalition with approximately 30 state and national partners in the GLBT and progressive movements.

OutFront Minnesota's staff is overseen by a board of directors, and works with hundreds of volunteers each year. The organization is a member of the Equality Federation. In early 2008, OutFront Minnesota experienced the departure of its founding executive director, Ann DeGroot. Monica Meyer is the current executive director.

Mission 
OutFront Minnesota's Mission Statement is "to create a state where lesbian, gay, bisexual, transgender, and queer people are free to be who they are, love who they love, and live without fear of violence, harassment or discrimination."

Programs 
OutFront Minnesota provides several programs to support the LGBTQIA+ and allied community including Anti-Violence, Community Organizing, Legal, Education and Training, and Public Policy, which includes lobbying the state legislature.

Anti-Violence Program 

The goal of the Anti-Violence Programs (AVP) is to end violence LGBTQIA+ community in the state of Minnesota. The AVP use an inter-sectional lens to honor and understand survivor's experiences. The organization hopes to create a safe environment for all individuals but specifically focuses on issues relative to sexual orientation or gender performance. The AVP work to increase anti-violence education within the LGBTQIA+ community. Additionally, the AVP gives survivors the capabilities to file and report instances of violence.

Lobby Day & Youth Summit 

OutFront sponsors a lobby day in the state capitol in St. Paul called "justFair Lobby Day", at which constituents from across Minnesota gather at the Minnesota State Capitol to meet with their representatives.

OutFront also tries to empower youth to get involved in their community by hosting a Youth Summit. The Youth Summit is organized and run by adolescent activists. Students gave lectures about the LGBTQIA+ community and activism examples of past lecture topics were: Mental Health, LGBTQ Movement beyond Marriage, Intersections of Identity, Black Lives Matter, etc.

Minnesota GSA Network 

In 2015, OutFront Minnesota launched their "Minnesota School Pride GSA Network", a statewide GSA program created to connect queer youth within the state of Minnesota.

Needs Assessments 

OutFront Minnesota has participated in the creation of needs assessments for segments of the LGBTQIA+ community with other LGBTQIA+ advocacy organizations. The 2001 Bisexual Social and Community Needs Assessment was published by OutFront Minnesota, the Bisexual Organizing Project (BOP), and the University of Minnesota. The Bisexual Community Needs Assessment 2012 was published by BOP partnering with OutFront Minnesota, the PFund Foundation, and the Gender and Sexuality Student Services Office (GSSSO) at the Metropolitan State University. OutFront Minnesota also assisted the PFund Foundation with the 2012 Twin Cities LGBT Aging Needs and Assessment Survey Report.

Actions

Marriage 

OutFront Minnesota, with the support of Senator Allan Spear and Representative Karen Clark, led the effort to amend the state's Human Rights Act to include sexual orientation and gender identity, a change which was achieved in 1993.

OutFront Minnesota also led a successful three-year campaign to defeat an anti-equality constitutional amendment to bar Minnesota's same-sex couples from marrying. On May 14, 2013, there was a 37–30 bipartisan vote to allow same-sex couples to marry. Executive Director Monica Meyer stated on the matter, "We want to thank House Speaker Thissen, Senate Majority Leader Bakk and all of the legislators who voted yes – and, of course, Governor Dayton who has been so supportive of LGBT equality. We also want to thank each and every person who dedicated their time and energy to make this happen."

OutFront Minnesota worked with individuals to use personal stories to lobby the Minnesota legislature, helping Minnesota become the twelfth state to legalize same-sex marriage.

Safe Schools 

Before the Safe School Act was signed into law 2014, Minnesota had relatively weak anti-bullying policies. The "Safe and Supportive school Act" was passed on April 4, 2014, with a 36–31 vote after hours of debate in the Minnesota Senate.

OutFront Minnesota lobbied the state of Minnesota legislature for education reform. Anti-bullying legislation became a larger issue within the state of Minnesota, as a result of a string of bullying incidents within Anoka County. The bullying incidents became so severe within the county that the United States Judicial department became involved. The Safe and Support School Act protected from; religious, racial, gender identity, and sexual orientation discrimination.

The act does not mandate private or home school to follow the law. After hours of debate the Safe and Supportive Act was passed. A compromise that occurred that the law no longer required school to report and collect date about these bullying cases. Additionally under the compromise, school districts did not have train volunteers. Much of the opposition toward the legislation came from the Minnesota Republican Party. This contention spurred from the cost of the law, and inclusion of sexual orientation. The estimated cost of the Safe and Support Schools Act was to around $19 billion.

Transgender Rights 

The American Civil Liberties Union represented OutFront Minnesota and Evan Thomas in a case deciding whether Medical Assistance (MA), Minnesota's Medicaid program, covers gender affirmation surgeries for transgender individuals. A judge in the U.S. District Court in Minnesota ruled in their favor on November 14, 2016, that MA covers gender affirmation surgeries in the state of Minnesota.

See also

 LGBT rights in Minnesota
 List of LGBT rights organizations
 Same-sex marriage in Minnesota

References

External links
Outfront Minnesota Online

1987 establishments in Minnesota
Equality Federation
LGBT political advocacy groups in Minnesota
Non-profit organizations based in Minnesota
Organizations based in Minnesota
Organizations established in 1987